Tricky Business may refer to:

 Tricky Business (Australian TV series) an Australian television drama series
 Tricky Business (UK TV series) a British children's television comedy series
Tricky Business (novel), a novel by Dave Barry